A goddess is a female deity.

Goddess of victory may refer to:

Mythology
 Nike (mythology), Greek goddess who personifies victory
 Victoria (mythology), Roman goddess of victory

Statues
 Altare della Patria, features two statues of Victoria]riding on quadrigas in Rome
 Dewey Monument, a statue at Union Square, San Francisco
 Winged Victory of Samothrace, a marble sculpture displayed at the Louvre
Victory, 1902 statue in New York City by Augustus Saint-Gaudens

See also
 Victory column
 Goddess of Victory: Nikke, a video game
 Winged Victory (disambiguation)

All article disambiguation pages
All disambiguation pages